Etli köfte or Acem köftesi is a Turkish recipe for big meatballs (köfte in Turkish) from Eastern Anatolia Region of Turkey, from the city of Van. The ingredients are ground beef, rice, bulgur, yellow split peas, leeks, mint, parsley, onion and local spices.

See also 
Köfte
Tabriz meatballs
List of meatball dishes

Notes and references

External links 
http://www.kanald.com.tr/mutfagim/Haberler/Acem-Koftesi-Tarifi/51733.aspx

Kofta
Van, Turkey